Brinnington is a north-eastern suburb of Stockport, Greater Manchester, England, on a bluff above a bend in the Tame Valley between the M60 motorway and Reddish Vale Country Park.

Description
Brinnington was open farm land before the local authority housing developments of the 1950s and 1960s. To the west of Brinnington is Reddish Vale, a country park popular with  families to go for a walk and explore the ponds and brick viaducts; under the arches there is a sharp bend in the river and sand has been deposited giving the effect of a miniature beach.

The area consists mainly of council owned dwellings including high rise flats. Brinnington has high crime levels and long-term unemployment at 20%. Two streets, Northumberland Road and Brinnington Road, were named by police as two of the three worst roads in north Stockport in 2010.

The area has undergone regeneration, including the demolition of the Top Shops site, replaced with 53 shared ownership houses, and First House community centre which opened in 2007. In 2009, 17 new homes were built at Lantern Close, a new road named after the annual lantern parade in the area.

History 
The name 'Brinnington' is derived from Old English. It means the 'farm (tun) called after Bryni (a personal name).' The location of the farmstead is unknown.

Brinnington is not named in the Domesday survey of 1086 - it is believed to have been in the manor of Bredbury and probably became a barony of Stockport in the twelfth century.

From the mid-fourteenth century, the lords of the land were the Duckenfield family. Under the Duckenfields, the southern third of the township was held as a demesne named Portwood. By the 1540s, the family had a residence (Portwood Hall), a deer park and a corn mill. The northern part of the township was common moorland known as Brinnington Moor.

The area remained largely rural up until the 1950s. In 1754, only 15 families (104 individuals) were recorded. The population grew significantly throughout the nineteenth century, due to the development of nearby Portwood. 

In the early 1780s, the manor was acquired by James Harrison, a Manchester cotton merchant who, in 1786, built a bridge between Portwood and Brinnington, and in 1796, built a millrace (Portwood Cut) to bring water power to the area. The population growth of the Brinnington area was driven by these developments and in 1841 counted 5331 individuals. Since the council housing was built in the mid-twentieth century, the population naturally increased again as it transitioned from a rural to suburban area.

Transport

Brinnington is served by Brinnington railway station on the Hope Valley Line from Sheffield to Manchester.

The estate is accessed via Brinnington Road, which crosses the M60 motorway at both ends. 

The original proposed Manchester congestion charge would have charged motorists for crossing the M60 motorway; protests from local residents led to a change in the proposed boundaries, thereby excluding Brinnington from the charge zone.

Religion
Brinnington has two churches, St. Bernadette's (Roman Catholic) and Brinnington Community Church at the Lighthouse Centre (Evangelical).

Education
There are three primary schools, St. Paul's (Church Of England), St. Bernadette's (Roman Catholic) and Westmorland; the last being an amalgamation of the former Brindale, Maycroft and Tame Valley Primary Schools.

Health
A survey was done by a local GP to investigate why the depression rate in Brinnington was 23.6%, compared with an average of 9.8% in the rest of England. His records concurred. In his last 123 patients,  24% were seeking help with depression, while a further 28% were under treatment and 16% had been.

Law
Hollow End Towers in Brinnington were the subject of one of the leading cases on the law of nuisance, Transco plc v Stockport Metropolitan BC.

Notes

External links

Areas of Stockport